Goldston Commercial Historic District is a national historic district located at Goldston, Chatham County, North Carolina.  The district encompasses 15 contributing buildings in the central business district of Goldston. The buildings date from about 1890 to 1935 and includes of rows of one and two-story brick flat-roofed
commercial buildings. Notable buildings include the Bynum and Paschal Warehouse (c. 1895), the Bynum and Paschal/Second Farmer's Union Company Store (c. 1899), the First Farmer's Union Store (c. 1908), A.J. Goldston General Store (c. 1890), and McLaurin Grocery Store (c. 1930).

It was listed on the National Register of Historic Places in 1987.

References

Historic districts on the National Register of Historic Places in North Carolina
Historic districts in Chatham County, North Carolina
National Register of Historic Places in Chatham County, North Carolina